Ilka Groenewold (* March 6, 1985 in Leer (East Frisia), Germany) is a German television presenter and athlete.

Life 
Ilka Groenewold graduated in 2005 from the Teletta-Groß-Gymnasium in Leer. She then completed a musical theater training at the Hamburg School of Entertainment, during which she appeared on the theater stage in Hamburg productions at the Hamburger Schauspielhaus, Thalia Theater and Operettenhaus.

Ilka Groenewold studied American Studies and Sports Science at the University of Hamburg in Hamburg from 2012 to 2015. She graduated with a Bachelor of Arts degree. 
Before and during her studies, Ilka hosted events and worked at VIVA in 2001 and Channel 21 in 2012. In 2007, Ilka played the role of Lisi  in the sitcom "Wilde Jungs" on ProSieben. In 2010, she was a reporter on Galileo.

In parallel, Ilka Groenewold participated in running events  and was named "Hobbyläufer des Jahres" ("hobby runner of the year") in 2012 by the Deutscher Leichtathletik Verband.

Since 2008 she moderates at the Hamburg TV station "noa4 Nachbarn on Air"  up to three times a week. On the ImmoScout24 Plattform "wohnen weiter denken" she takes over the moderation of the TV format "Miet and Greet".
Since 2021 Ilka has been a journalist and reporter for Welt 
and for the Hamburg station "Hamburg 1" since November 2021. Since March 2022, Ilka has been the presenter of the daily news programme "Hamburg 1 Aktuell". In June 2022, Ilka hosts the Handball Champions League Final (EHF Final 4 Men) in Cologne. Since July 2022 Ilka can additionally be seen at the station Hamburg 1 in the "Frühcafe".

In the manga series Naruto, she took on the roles of "Mikoto Uchiha", "Ajisai" and the stadium announcer in "Boruto: Naruto the Movie".

In the fall of 2020 her book "Empowerment - Wegweiser in ein erfülltes Leben"  was published. It is a guide book on fitness, nutrition, motivation, finance, real estate, mindset etc.

In December 2020, Ilka's first single "Ewig dauert die Sekunde"  was released. In 2021, she released the song "HSV (Das Sind Wir)"  for the HSV football team.

In May 2022 Ilka published her 2nd book "Erfolgskompass – deine Reise zum Erfolg", which was also published in the English version "Success Compass - Your Journey to Success"  in July 2022.

Ilka Groenewold lives in Hamburg and Leer/East Frisia.

Discography 
 2020: "Ewig dauert die Sekunde"
 2021: "HSV (Das Sind Wir)"

Books 
 2020: "Empowerment – Wegweiser in ein erfülltes Leben" 
 2021: "Empowerment – Guide to a Fulfilled Life" 
 2022: "Erfolgskompass – Deine Reise zum Erfolg" 
 2022: "Success Compass – Your Journey to Success"

Awards 
 2011 Hamburg's Ice Princess ambassador of the Hanseatic city of Hamburg
 2012 Runner of the Year DLV German Athletics Association 
 2013 Young Entrepreneur Award
 2017 59th Bieler Lauftage, Biel/Bienne 2017 1st place W30 
 2018 12th Cuxhavener Stadtsparkassen Marathon 2018 1st place 
 2020 Role Model Entrepreneur Federal Ministry for Economic Affairs and Energy 
 2021 Red Fox Award Winner 
 2021 Presenter of the Year (2021) Winner 
 2022 Digitale Orte Niedersachsen Winner

References

External links 
 Official homepage of Ilka Groenewold
 
 Ilka Groenewold on crew united  
 Ilka Groenewold on the Internet Movie Database 
 Synchronkartei with results for Ilka Groenewold
  Ilka Groenewold on Moderatorxxl
  XING Ambassador Ilka Groenewold

Living people
1985 births
Mass media people from Hamburg
People from Leer
University of Hamburg alumni
German television presenters
German women television presenters